The Roman Catholic Diocese of Bom Jesus da Lapa is a diocese located in the city of Bom Jesus da Lapa in the Ecclesiastical province of Vitória da Conquista in Brazil.

History
 22 July 1962: Established as Diocese of Bom Jesus da Lapa from the Diocese of Barra

Bishops
Bishops of Bom Jesus da Lapa (Latin Rite)
 José Nicomedes Grossi (1962.08.28 – 1990.03.15)
 Francisco Batistela, C.Ss.R. (1990.04.18 – 2009.01.28)
 José Valmor César Teixeira, S.D.B. (2009.01.28 - 2014.03.20), appointed Bishop of São José dos Campos, São Paulo
 João Santos Cardoso (2015.06.24 - present)

Coadjutor bishop
João Nílton dos Santos Souza (1986-1988), did not succeed to see; appointed Bishop of Amargosa, Bahia

References
 GCatholic.org
 Catholic Hierarchy

Roman Catholic dioceses in Brazil
Christian organizations established in 1962
Bom Jesus da Lapa, Roman Catholic Diocese of
Roman Catholic dioceses and prelatures established in the 20th century
1962 establishments in Brazil